You Can't Fool Antoinette (French: On ne roule pas Antoinette) is a 1936 French comedy film directed by Paul Madeux and starring Armand Bernard, Paul Pauley and Simone Renant. The film's sets were designed by the art directors Henri Ménessier and René Renoux.

Cast
 Armand Bernard as Hubert de Prémaillac  
 Paul Pauley as Le marquis de la Tour-Barrée  
 Simone Renant as Antoinette  
 Pierre Stéphen as Stanislas de Varini  
 Alice Tissot as La marquise de la Tour-Barrée  
 Saint-Granier as Lepitois 
 Charles Lemontier as Le domestique  
 Suzy Leroy 
 Rogers

References

Bibliography 
 Goble, Alan. The Complete Index to Literary Sources in Film. Walter de Gruyter, 1999.

External links 
 

1936 films
French comedy films
1936 comedy films
1930s French-language films
French black-and-white films
Films scored by Casimir Oberfeld
1930s French films